Oceans of Venus is the second album from London-based glam rockers, Rachel Stamp. The album was released in 2002 on Pure Stirling Records. Preceded by Rachel Stamp's highest charting single to date, "Black Cherry", the album was met with critical acclaim from the music press and some mixed feelings from fans that wanted an album similar to the raw, glam pop of the debut, "Hymns for Strange Children". The album has also been released in Germany (through Sony Music) and in the United States of America (through Captiva Records/Underground Inc.). "Oceans of Venus" has sold over 25,000 copies in the UK alone.

UK release

Track list
 Starbirth in the Triffid Nebula 
 Les Oceans Dé Venus
 Black Cherry
 Witches of Ängelhölm
 Do Me in Once and I’ll Be Sad, Do Me in Twice and I’ll Know Better 
 Superstars of Heartache
 The Agony of St. Teresa
 Permanent Damage
 Twisted
 Crucified
 The Loveless
 Victory

Credits
 Produced by Rodger Tebutt and Rachel Stamp
 Mixed by Rodger Tebbutt
 Cover photo by Paul Harries. Retouching by Joe at Genesis 
 Sleeve design by Jules at Vegas Design
 Inner photos by Heike Schneider-Matzigkeit

Limited edition (US only)

Track list
 Starbirth in the Triffid Nebula 
 Les Oceans de Venus
 Black Cherry
 Witches of Ängelholm
 Heroine
 Do Me in Once And I’ll Be Sad, Do Me in Twice and I’ll Know Better [new album mix]
 Superstars of Heartache
 The Agony of St. Teresa
 My Sweet Rose [Hymns for Strange Children version]
 Permanent Damage
 Twisted
 Crucified
 The Loveless
 Victory
 Do Me in Once and I’ll Be Sad, Do Me in Twice and I’ll Know Better (Radio Edit)
 Black Cherry (Radio Edit)

Credits
 Limited Edition release of "Oceans of Venus" through Captiva Records
 Features 4 bonus tracks - "Heroine" (from the unreleased WEA album, "Fight the Force of Evil"), "My Sweet Rose" (from "Hymns for Strange Children") & two radio edits of "Do Me In..." & "Black Cherry". 
 Produced by Rodger Tebbutt and Rachel Stamp (except "My Sweet Rose" - Produced by John Fryer)
 Mixed by Rodger Tebutt
 Features new artwork by Jimmy B. 
 Inner photos by Heike Schneider-Matzigkeit

US version

Track list
 Starbirth in the Triffid Nebula 
 Les Oceans Dé Venus
 Black Cherry
 Witches Of Ängelhölm
 Do Me in Once and I’ll Be Sad, Do Me in Twice and I’ll Know Better (New Album Mix) 
 Superstars of Heartache
 The Agony of St. Teresa
 Permanent Damage
 Twisted
 Crucified
 The Loveless
 Victory

Credits
 Released through Underground Inc./Captiva and distributed across America by Caroline Records.
 Originally planned to be a re-release of the UK edition with the same artwork as the Limited Edition version. Brand new artwork was drawn up from scratch by Vania Zouravilov and David Ryder-Prangley due to another artist using similar artwork. 
 The tracks that had previously been added to “Oceans of Venus” were removed for this version as “it was not the album we had made, and although "My Sweet Rose" and "Heroine" are fabulous songs (which is why they were added), the album is only proper without.” – David Ryder-Prangley, 2003 
 Produced by Rodger Tebbutt and Rachel Stamp
 Mixed by Rodger Tebutt
 Inner photos by Heike Schneider-Matzigkeit
 Lettering by Davina

Rachel Stamp albums
2002 albums